This is a list of notable disc golf brands and manufacturers.

See also 

 Lists of brands – brand-related list articles on Wikipedia
 Lists of companies (category)
 Basket (disc golf)

Notes

References

External links
 Disc Golf Disc and Target Manufacturer Contact Information on the PDGA website
 Disc Golf Manufacturers & Distributors on the PDGA website

Brands
Lists of brands
Lists of manufacturers